Rybalskyi Island (translit. ; literally: Fisherman's island) is a misnomer for an actual peninsula on the Dnieper River, located in the right-bank Podil neighborhood and Kyiv Harbor of the city of Kyiv. Although named as an island it is in fact a peninsula and a former spit serving as a left-bank of a former Pochaina River that with time transformed into several oxbow lakes located in Obolon (see Opechen lakes). The peninsula is now a predominantly industrial area.

History
The peninsula was formed from clay deposits, which served as the left-bank of the Pochaina River. Rybalskyi Peninsula takes its name from the fishermen of Podil who once lived on it. In 1897-1899, the peninsula was raised and strengthened, which would later enable it to house a local shipyard for steamboats (engineered by M.Maksymovych), as well as to form the newly built Kyiv Harbor between the peninsula and the Podil riverbank.

In 1926-1930, an electrical power station was constructed in the north-western part of the peninsula (engineered by B. Domanskyi and M. Parusnikov), today Thermal power station-2 (power and heat producing station). During this time an industrial area has developed here. On the banks of the harbor in the Sailors Park a ship-monument to Monitor Zhelezniakov was installed on a pedestal. In 1929 Petrovsky Railway Bridge was finally officially opened after 10 year of abandonment. In the end of the 1930s, the Kuznya na Rybalskomu shipbuilding factory was reconstructed (now it owned by President of Ukraine Petro Poroshenko.

During the Second World War, the peninsula suffered heavy damage from bombings. After the war, reconstruction began, while new factories and foundations were constructed. The Petrovsky Railway Bridge, shipyard, power station, and others were rebuilt.

Present infrastructure

In 1961, piers of the new Kyiv River Port was built in the Harbor, and in 1963 the Kyiv cable-stayed bridge was constructed to provide road access to the Rybalskyi Peninsula from the center of the city. In 2001 the bridge was closed to a vehicle traffic, because of its conditions. In 2009 it was closed completely and eventually was partially disassembled with construction of the new Kyiv Harbor Bridge.

The main compound of the GUR MOU, the military intelligence institution, is located on the Rybalskyi Peninsula.

Development plans
In 2005, plans were released for the perspective reconstruction of the Rybalskyi Peninsula, by the year 2020. Included into the plan are residential and business buildings, underground parking, hotel-office combination buildings, trade centers, and socio-cultural constructions. In addition, the Kyiv Metro station, Sudnobudyvina of the Podilsko-Vyhurivska Line, is currently being constructed on the peninsula, which will provide better access to the peninsula from the city.

References

 

Neighborhoods in Kyiv
Peninsulas of Ukraine